Mohammad Khadeer Babu is a Telugu short story writer, journalist and Telugu movie script writer.

Childhood and early life
He hails from Kavali a town in Nellore district (Andhra pradesh, India). He studied B.Sc Computer Science in Jawahar Bharati College. Born in a middle class Muslim family to Mohammed Kareem and Sartaj Begum.

Career

As short story writer
His short stories Dargamitta Kathalu and Polerammabanda Kathalu are known for their nativity and regional dialect. Being a Muslim, his stories reflect the traditions and culture of Muslim community. The stories in these two volumes are the childhood experiences of the writer narrated from the point of view of a child. The real beauty of the stories lies in the way the writer narrates the incidents using the regional dialect without losing his grip on the childhood innocence which gives a realistic picture of the life. This aspect makes the audience look into the details of the life lived by the writer and his family which the child himself is hardly aware of. This spirit in the story makes humour and pathos run hand in hand in the story. New Bombay Tailors, Phuppujaan Kathalu, Beyond Coffee, Metro Kathalu, Zero Blood are his other major works.

As Movie script writer
As a movie script writer, Khadeer babu has written dialogues for Onamalu, Brahmotsavam, Manamantha.

References

Telugu writers
Screenwriters from Andhra Pradesh
People from Nellore district
Telugu screenwriters